Sanyal is a Bengali Hindu surname, common among residents of the Indian state of West Bengal.
Sanyals are considered as Brahmins.

Notable people
 B. C. Sanyal, artist
 Chandan Roy Sanyal, actor
 Gautam Sanyal, secretary to Chief Minister of West Bengal Mamata Banerjee
 Kanu Sanyal, politician
 Meera Sanyal, banker
 Milan K. Sanyal, physicist
 Nalinaksha Sanyal, politician, economist and freedom fighter
 Narayan Sanyal, author
 Pahari Sanyal, actor
 Ram Brahma Sanyal, zoologist
 Ritwik Sanyal, classical singer
 Sachindra Nath Sanyal, revolutionary
 Sanjeev Sanyal, economist and author
 Satarupa Sanyal, director
 Sugata Sanyal, computer scientist
 Sulekha Sanyal, author and activist
 Sumita Sanyal, actress
 Usha Sanyal, historian

References 

Lists of people by surname
Bengali Hindu surnames